Disautel is a census-designated place (CDP) in Okanogan County, Washington, United States, within the Greater Omak Area. The population was 78 at the 2010 census.

It was formerly a logging town that was home to the headquarters of the Biles-Coleman Logging Company. When the highway to Nespelem Community was improved, workers in the sawmill began commuting from Omak, and the town population began to dwindle. After the sawmill closed at the beginning of the Great Depression, the town shrank further. For some time, the Highway Department used the empty warehouses in the town to store roadworking equipment, but that ultimately did not last, and the town was abandoned.

See also
 Disautel Pass
 Washington State Route 155

References

Census-designated places in Washington (state)
Geography of Okanogan County, Washington
Ghost towns in Washington (state)
Logging communities in the United States
Census-designated places in Okanogan County, Washington
Populated places in Greater Omak
Populated places in the Okanagan Country